The Wainuiomata River runs southwest through the Wainuiomata Valley located in the southern Remutaka Range in the North Island, New Zealand.

Origin of name
The word Wainui-o-Mata is a Māori name made up of the elements wai (water), nui (big), o (of) and Mata – which could refer to a woman's name. The origins of the name remain disputed, but one commonly accepted explanation refers to women who came over the  Wainuiomata Hill to evade marauding tribes from the north, and who sat wailing by the stream after the slaughter of their menfolk. From this we have "faces streaming with water" or "tears" - although the name could equally refer to the large pools of water which lay over the swampy surface (face) of the northern end of the Valley, or to the river itself, which can flood the Wainui (Coast Road) valley.

 it is commonly called the "Wainui River", as the suburb of Wainuiomata is informally named "Wainui".

History

The earliest settlements were based around the river where the timber mills supplied the Wellington region where the demand was great in the 1850s and 1860s. Today this area is known as "The Village" or as "Homedale".

In 1879 the Wellington ratepayers voted to extend their water supply, and by 1884 a dam was built in Sinclair Valley (Waterworks Valley) and a pipeline ran across the Wainuiomata Valley floor, through a tunnel under the hill, and on to Wellington. This dam was replaced in 1910 with the Morton Dam since decommissioned, while the Ōrongorongo tunnel and pipelines were implemented by 1926. The establishment of the waterworks meant the coming of the telephone although, by 1921, there were still only two subscribers.

 the Wainuiomata/Ōrongorongo Catchment Area is a restricted area as it supplies much of the Wellington region with water.

External links

 Wainuiomata online

Rivers of the Wellington Region
Rivers of New Zealand